Jill Beck (born 1949) is an American dancer, scholar, administrator and educator. She served as the 15th president of Lawrence University from July 2004 to 2013. On February 2, 2012, Beck announced her intention to retire, and was succeeded by Mark Burstein.

Early life and education 
A native of Worcester, Massachusetts, Beck received a B.A. in philosophy and art history from Clark University, an M.A. in history and music from McGill University, and a Ph.D. in theatre history and criticism from the City University of New York.

Career 
As dean of the School of the Arts at the University of California, Irvine from 1995 to 2003, she instituted a strategic planning process and led a capital campaign that contributed to the school's endowment, facilities, educational mission, and outreach activities. Under her leadership, the school was named the Claire Trevor School of the Arts and undergraduate applications increased by more than 70 percent over four years.

During her tenure as dean, Beck founded the ArtsBridge outreach program in art education, with professor Keith Fowler as its initial administrative director. Now named ArtsBridge America, the program is an arts partnership between universities and the K-12 community. The program offers hands-on experiences in the arts to school-age children, placing university students in K-12 classrooms as instructors and mentors. Beck also established the da Vinci Research Center for Learning Through the Arts, an interdisciplinary center for research focused on learning across disciplines.

In 2000, Beck co-chaired an international conference entitled "Sciences for the Arts: Building a Coalition for Arts Education" that brought psychological and medical researchers together with artists and art educators.

Beck is both a scholar and a practitioner of dance and choreography and has written in the fields of dance history, theory, repertory, and technique, as well as directed ballet and modern dance repertory. In addition to holding an appointment as professor of dance at UCI, she has taught at the City College of New York and the Juilliard School. Beck was a founding member of the Alliance of Dance Notation Educators.

Recognition 
Beck is a recipient of the Disney Corporation's Jack Linquist Award for Innovation, the American Red Cross's Clara Barton Award for humanitarian service in the arts, and the University of California, Irvine, Medal, the university's highest honor, for "visionary leadership in building community."

Personal life 
Beck is married to Robert J. Beck.

References

1949 births
Living people
Clark University alumni
McGill University School of Music alumni
Presidents of Lawrence University
City College of New York faculty